Jianguo Lu (16 February 1646 – 29 March 1653) was the regnal year of Zhu Yihai, Prince of Lu of the Southern Ming.

Comparison table

Other regime era names that existed during the same period
 China
 Shunzhi (順治, 1644–1661): Qing dynasty — era name of the Shunzhi Emperor
 Longwu (隆武, 1645–1646): Southern Ming — era name of the Longwu Emperor
 Yongli (永曆, 1647–1683): Southern Ming — era name of the Yongli Emperor
 Dongwu (東武, 1648): Southern Ming — era name of Zhu Changqing, Prince of Huai
 Dingwu (定武, 1646–1664): Southern Ming — era name of Zhu Benli (Zhu Danji), Prince of Han (doubtful)
 Dashun (大順, 1644–1646): Xi dynasty — era name of Zhang Xianzhong
 Zhongxing (中興, 1647): Qing period — era name of the Jiang Erxun (蔣爾恂)
 Tianzheng (天正, 1648): Qing period — era name of Zhang Jintang (張近堂)
 Vietnam
 Phúc Thái (福泰, 1643–1649): Later Lê dynasty — era name of Lê Chân Tông
 Khánh Đức (慶德, 1649–1653): Later Lê dynasty — era name of Lê Thần Tông
 Thịnh Đức (盛德, 1653–1658): Later Lê dynasty — era name of Lê Thần Tông
Japan
 Shōhō (正保, 1644–1648): era name of Emperor Go-Kōmyō
 Keian (慶安, 1648–1652): era name of Emperor Go-Kōmyō
 Jōō (承応, 1652–1655): era name of Emperor Go-Kōmyō and Emperor Go-Sai

See also
 Prince of Lu (Ming dynasty)
 List of Chinese era names
 List of Ming dynasty era names

Notes

References

Further reading

Southern Ming eras